Astley Abbotts is a civil parish in Shropshire, England.  It contains 22 listed buildings that are recorded in the National Heritage List for England.  Of these, three are listed at Grade II*, the middle grade of the three grades, and the others are at Grade II, the lowest grade.  The parish contains the small village of Astley Abbotts and is otherwise rural.  Apart from a church, all the listed buildings are houses and associated structures, farm houses and farm buildings, most of them in the countryside around the village.


Key

Buildings

References

Citations

Sources

Lists of buildings and structures in Shropshire